Mayavanathan was a Tamil poet and lyricist in Tamil Cinema.

Popular Mayavanathan movies

MAYAVANATHAN movie list (Year wise)
	
 1.	Thiruvarul (1975)
 2.	Delhi to Madras (1972)
 3.	Therottam (1971)
 4.	Kaval Deivam (1969)
 5.	Magizhampoo (1969)
 6.	Thaalaattu (1969)
 7.	Kaathal Paduthum Paadu (1969)
 8.	Lakshmi Kalyanam (1968)
 9.	Ther Thiruvizha (1968)
 10.	Theiveega Uravu (1968)
 11.	Karpooram (1967)
 12.	Marakka Mudiyuma (1966)
 13.	Poomalai (1965)
 14.	Thayin Karunai (1965)
 15.	Enna Thaan Mudivu (1965)
 16.	Thozilali (1964)
 17.	Poombugar (1964)
 18.	Bandha Pasam (1962)
 19.	Idayathil Nee (1962)

NB: Mayavanathan died in 1971 and he had written last lyrics for the movie Delhi to Madras. The same year he wrote songs for the movie Thiruvarul and that movie was released during the year 1975.

Death
Mayavanathan died 1971 in Chennai, and his funeral was held at Poolangulam in which Kannadasan also took part.

References

External links
 https://archive.today/20130116032242/http://en.600024.com/lyricist/mayavanathan-songs/
 http://www.tfmpage.com/forum/7452.20.43.29.html
 http://cinefolks.com/tamil/AudioSongs/lyrics/Mayavanathan/
 

1971 deaths
Tamil film poets
Year of birth missing